This is a list of St. Louis Blues award winners.

League awards

Team trophies

Individual awards

All-Stars

NHL first and second team All-Stars
The NHL first and second team All-Stars are the top players at each position as voted on by the Professional Hockey Writers' Association.

NHL All-Rookie Team
The NHL All-Rookie Team consists of the top rookies at each position as voted on by the Professional Hockey Writers' Association.

All-Star Game selections
The National Hockey League All-Star Game is a mid-season exhibition game held annually between many of the top players of each season. Forty-four All-Star Games have been held since the Blues entered the league in 1967, with at least one player chosen to represent the Blues in each year. The All-Star game has not been held in various years: 1979 and 1987 due to the 1979 Challenge Cup and Rendez-vous '87 series between the NHL and the Soviet national team, respectively, 1995, 2005, and 2013 as a result of labor stoppages, 2006, 2010, and 2014 because of the Winter Olympic Games, and 2021 as a result of the COVID-19 pandemic. St. Louis has hosted two of the games. The 23rd and 39th took place at St. Louis Arena.

 Selected by fan vote
 Selected as one of four "last men in" by fan vote
 Selected by Commissioner
 All-Star Game Most Valuable Player

Career achievements

Hockey Hall of Fame
The following is a list of St. Louis Blues who have been enshrined in the Hockey Hall of Fame.

Foster Hewitt Memorial Award
One member of the St. Louis Blues organization have been honored with the Foster Hewitt Memorial Award. The award is presented by the Hockey Hall of Fame to members of the radio and television industry who make outstanding contributions to their profession and the game of ice hockey during their broadcasting career.

Lester Patrick Trophy
The Lester Patrick Trophy has been presented by the National Hockey League and USA Hockey since 1966 to honor a recipient's contribution to ice hockey in the United States. This list includes all personnel who have ever been employed by the St. Louis Blues in any capacity and have also received the Lester Patrick Trophy.

United States Hockey Hall of Fame

Retired numbers

The St. Louis Blues have retired eight of their jersey numbers and removed two others from circulation. The number 7 was honored on March 7, 2011, in tribute to four Blues who wore it – Red Berenson, Garry Unger, Joe Mullen, and Keith Tkachuk. The number 14 was honored for Doug Wickenheiser who played for the team from 1984 to 1987. Also out of circulation is the number 99 which was retired league-wide for Wayne Gretzky on February 6, 2000. Gretzky played one season (1995–96) of his 20-year NHL career with the Blues and was the only Blues player who ever wore the number 99 prior to its retirement.

Other awards

See also
List of National Hockey League awards

References

St. Louis Blues
award winners